Sir David Elias Ezra (1871-1947) (or simply Sir David Ezra) was a prominent member of the Baghdadi Jewish community in Calcutta, India.

Early life and family
David Elias Ezra was born in 1871, the son of Elias David Ezra and the grandson of David Joseph Ezra. He married Rachel Sassoon, daughter of Solomon David Sassoon.

Positions
Ezra was Sheriff of Calcutta and a director of the Reserve Bank of India. He was president of the Jewish Relief Association and of The Asiatic Society.

Death
Ezra died in 1947.

See also
History of the Jews in Kolkata

References 

1871 births
1947 deaths
David
Sheriffs of Kolkata
Presidents of The Asiatic Society
Indian Knights Bachelor
Indian people of Iraqi-Jewish descent